St. Stephen's Church, or Saint Stephen Church or variations, may refer to:

Armenia 
 Saint Stephen Church of Lmbat Monastery, Artik, Shirak Province
 Saint Stephen Church of Abovyan, Kotayk Province

Australia 
 Old St Stephen's Church, Brisbane
 St. Stephen's, Kellyville, New South Wales, see List of Anglican churches in the Diocese of Sydney
 St Stephen's Church, Ipswich, Queensland
 St. Stephen's Church, Penrith, New South Wales
 St. Stephen's Anglican Church, Wynyard, Tasmania 
 St Stephen's Presbyterian Church, Jamberoo, New South Wales
 St Stephen's Presbyterian Church and Manse, Queanbeyan, New South Wales
 St Stephen's Uniting Church, Sydney

Austria 
 St. Stephen's Cathedral, Vienna
 St. Stephan, Baden

Belgium 
 St. Stefanus, Ghent

Canada 
 St. Stephen's Church, St. Stephen, New Brunswick
 St. Stephen's Catholic Church, North Vancouver, where Pierre Trudeau and Margaret Sinclair were married.
 St. Stephen's Anglican Church (Ottawa)
 St. Stephen's Anglican Church, Calgary, AB
 St. Stephen’s Anglican Church, Saanichton, BC

Cyprus 
 Sourp Stepanos Armenian Church of Larnaca

Czech Republic 
 St. Stephen's Church, Prague

El Salvador 
 St. Stephen's Church, San Esteban, San Salvador

France 

 Saint Stephen’s Church, Strasbourg

Georgia (country) 
 Church of Saint Stephen, Stephanopolis (undisclosed location), Lazica

Germany 
 St. Stephen's Abbey, Augsburg
 St. Stephan, Mainz
 St. Stephan, Munich

India 
 St. Stephen's Church, Delhi
 St. Stephen's Church, Kombuthurai
 St. Stephen's Church, Ootacamund

Iran 
 Saint Stepanos Monastery, Armenian Monastery of St. Stephen the Protomartyr

Ireland 
 St Stephen's Church, Dublin

The Netherlands 
 Saint Stephen's Church, Nijmegen

Poland 
 St. Stephen's Church, Katowice

Russia 
 Saint Stephen Armenian Church of Kaliningrad

Singapore 
 Church of St. Stephen, Singapore, a Catholic church in MacPherson, Singapore

Slovakia

Spain 
 Iglesia de San Esteban, Valencia

Sri Lanka 
 Saint Stephen's Church, Negombo

Turkey 
 Bulgarian St. Stephen Church
 St. Stepanos Armenian Church, Izmir, destroyed in 1922
 St. Stephen Latin Catholic Church, İstanbul

United Kingdom

England 
 St. Stephen's Church, St. Albans, one of the oldest churches in the world still in active use
 St Stephen's Church, Acomb
 St Stephen's Church, Bath
 Church of St Stephen on-the-Cliffs, Blackpool
 St Stephen's Church, Brighton
 St Stephen's Church, Bristol
St Stephen's Church, Bournemouth
 St. Stephen Coleman Street, a ruined church in the City of London
 St Stephen's Church, Copley
 St Stephen's Church, Ealing
 Old St Stephen's Church, Fylingdales, North Yorkshire
 St Paul and St Stephen's Church, Gloucester
 St Stephen and All Martyrs' Church, Lever Bridge, Greater Manchester
 St Stephen's Church, Gateacre, Liverpool
 St Stephen's Church, Low Elswick
 St Stephen's Church, Moulton, Cheshire
 St Stephen's Church, Norwich
 St Stephen's Church, Rosslyn Hill
 St Stephen's Church, Selly Park
 St Stephen's Church, Shepherd's Bush, London
 St Stephen's Church, Tonbridge, see List of places of worship in Tonbridge and Malling
 St Stephen's, Twickenham, London
 St Stephen Walbrook, City of London
 St Stephen's Church, Whelley, Greater Manchester
 Ss Alban and Stephen Church, St Albans

Scotland 
 St Stephen's Church, Edinburgh
 Old High St Stephen's, Inverness

Wales 
 St Stephen's Church, Cardiff
 St Stephen's Church, Old Radnor, Powys

Isle of Man 
 St Stephens Church and former School Room, Sulby, Lezayre, Isle of Man, one of Isle of Man's Registered Buildings

United States 
(ordered by state and city)
 St. Stephen's Church (Chicago, Illinois), located in Hyde Park; formerly the Tenth Church of Christ, Scientist
 St. Stephen's Episcopal Church (Newton, Iowa), listed on the National Register of Historic Places (NRHP) in Jasper County
 St. Stephen Church in Louisville, Kentucky, has the largest African American congregation in Kentucky
 St. Stephen's Church (Boston, Massachusetts), listed on the NRHP
 St. Stephen's Memorial Episcopal Church, Lynn, Massachusetts, listed on the NRHP
 Church of Saint Stephen (Minneapolis, Minnesota)
 St. Stephen's Church (New Hartford, New York), listed on the NRHP in Oneida County
 St. Stephen's Mar Thoma Church, East Brunswick, New Jersey
 St. Stephan's Church (Ironbound, Newark, New Jersey)
 St. Stephen's Catholic Church (Cleveland, Ohio)
 St. Stephen's Church (Bradys Bend, Pennsylvania), listed on the NRHP
 S. Stephen's Church (Providence, Rhode Island), listed on the NRHP
 St. Stephen's Church (Heathsville, Virginia), listed on the NRHP
 Saint Stephen Martyr Catholic Church (Washington, D.C.)

Vatican City 
 St Stephen of the Abyssinians (Santo Stefano degli Abissini), Vatican City

Fictional 
 St. Stephen's Church, Ambridge, the fictional church in The Archers.

See also 
 St. Stephen's Episcopal Church (disambiguation)
 St. Stephen's Cathedral (disambiguation)